Hughes 38 may refer to one of three related sailboat designs:

Hughes 38-1
Hughes 38-2
Hughes 38-3